Captain Marvel is a jazz album by saxophonist Stan Getz released in 1974 on the Columbia Records label. The album features performances by Getz with Chick Corea, who composed most of the material, Stanley Clarke, Airto Moreira and Tony Williams. Shortly before recording this album Corea, Clarke and Moreira had formed the core of the group Return to Forever, and Captain Marvel shares the Latin jazz and jazz fusion sound that Corea was exploring in this era.

Reception
The Allmusic review by Thom Jurek states "This band, combining as it did the restlessness of electric jazz with Getz's trademark stubbornness in adhering to those principles that made modern jazz so great, made for a tension that came pouring out of the speakers with great mutual respect shining forth from every cut — especially the steamy Latin-drenched title track. Along with Sweet Rain, recorded for Verve, Captain Marvel is the finest recording Getz made in the late 1960s - early 1970s".

Track listing 
All compositions by Chick Corea except as noted.
 "La Fiesta" – 8:21
 "Five Hundred Miles High" – 8:09
 "Captain Marvel" - 5:06
 "Times Lie" – 9:46
 "Lush Life" (Billy Strayhorn) – 4:14
 "Day Waves" – 9:39

Personnel 
 Stan Getz – tenor saxophone
 Chick Corea – electric piano
 Stanley Clarke – bass
 Airto Moreira – percussion
 Tony Williams – drums

Production 
 Recording Engineer: Dixon Van Winkle
 Remix Engineers: John Guerriere & Russ Payne
 Cover Design: Teresa Alfieri
 Cover Logo Design: Gerard Huerta
 Air Brushing: Roger Huyssen
 Back Cover Photo: Don Hunstein

Chart performance

References

External links
 
 

Stan Getz albums
1972 albums
Verve Records albums
Captain Marvel (DC Comics) in other media